The Davis Barn is a historic barn in rural Stone County, Arkansas.  It is located on the west side of Bob Davis Mountain Road (County Road 32) southwest of Pleasant Grove and Mill Creek.  It is a single-story wood-frame structure, built on a double crib plan.  It has vertical board siding, and an unusually wide driveway between the cribs.  Built in 1915, it is a rare 20th-century example of the double crib form, which was more commonly executed in log construction in the 19th century.

The barn was listed on the National Register of Historic Places in 1985.

See also
National Register of Historic Places listings in Stone County, Arkansas

References

Barns on the National Register of Historic Places in Arkansas
Buildings and structures completed in 1915
Buildings and structures in Stone County, Arkansas
National Register of Historic Places in Stone County, Arkansas